Lagan Technologies, part of KANA Software, provides G2C (government to citizen) technology. Lagan has over 200 public sector customers worldwide. Lagan’s products for government and Enterprise Case Management (ECM) are offered through several delivery methods.

The company was founded in 1994, and was acquired by KANA Software in November 2010. Lagan operates in both North America and the UK with its North American headquarters in Sunnyvale, CA, and its European headquarters in Belfast, Northern Ireland.

Company history 
Lagan Technologies was first established in 1994 with the launch of its first product, Frontline in 1998, a CRM solution designed to be technology-independent, with an open architecture, fast to implement and flexible to maintain.

Since 1999 Lagan's program, Frontline, was being adopted across the wider public sector in areas such as shared services and non-emergency call handling for police authorities.

In 2006, Lagan acquired Peter Martin Associates (PMA), a leader in the development of human services software and the first to offer commercial off-the-shelf (COTS) collaborative case management and eligibility screening solutions.

In 2007, Lagan Announced its first statewide deployment of Lagan Human Services with customer, Tennessee Department of Human Services, Adult Protective Services Division.

In 2009, released initial Cloud software offering Lagan OnDemand with customers that include: Bermuda; Cobb County, GA, and Pasadena, CA. Lagan also launched Citizen Mobile Application to Promote Increased Citizen Engagement and Self Service.

In 2010, Lagan entered the Australian market with Lagan Government CRM customer, Brisbane City Council. Lagan was acquired by KANA Software in October 2010 and remains focused on the public sector.

References 

Software companies based in California
Defunct software companies of the United States
Customer relationship management software companies
Multinational companies
American companies established in 1994
Companies based in Sunnyvale, California